The Baptist Convention of Kenya  is a Baptist Christian denomination in Kenya. It is affiliated with the Baptist World Alliance. The headquarters is in Nairobi.

History
The Convention has its origins in an American mission of the International Mission Board in 1956 in Nairobi.    In 1971, the Baptist Convention of Kenya was formally founded.  According to a denomination census released in 2020, it claimed 3,300 churches and 720,000 members.

Schools
It founded the Kenya Baptist Theological College in Limuru in 1981.

See also 
 Bible
 Born again
 Baptist beliefs
 Worship service (evangelicalism)
 Jesus Christ
 Believers' Church

References

External links
 Official Website

Baptist denominations in Africa
Baptist Christianity in Kenya